The Union Green is the town green of the New England town of Union, Connecticut. The Green is a small town-owned wedge at the north end of a triangle park area (known as Union Grove) formed by Town Hall Road, Buckley Highway and Kinney Hollow Road. The Green, Union Grove, and properties to the north along Route 190 are listed on the National Register of Historic Places as the Union Green Historic District.

The Old Town Hall (now a historical society museum) is the dominant feature on the Green.

Several town buildings, specifically the former town hall, library, Congregational Church, the Union School and former district school, and cemetery, are located around the Green. There are only two houses located around the immediate perimeter of Union Green. The oldest is the one built by Ezra Horton in 1759. The other is a newer house constructed in 1956.

Although the larger Union Grove to the west of the green is privately owned, it is used for public celebrations. Also in the Grove near the intersection of Kinney Hollow and Town Hall Roads is a rough-hewn granite slab with a bronze commemorative plaque honoring the site of the first meetinghouse.

In addition to serving a commemorative function, the green is used as a meeting place for parades and other town events. An Old Home Day celebration is held at the pavilion on the third weekend of August when there is a barbecue and an evening dance.

The green and surrounding buildings are significant as a historic district for their evoking "the location's historic role as the town's political, religious, educational and social center", for preserving examples of architecture, and for 18th century stonecarved funerary art included in the cemetery.

See also
National Register of Historic Places listings in Tolland County, Connecticut

References

Historic districts in Tolland County, Connecticut
Union, Connecticut
National Register of Historic Places in Tolland County, Connecticut
New England town greens
Historic districts on the National Register of Historic Places in Connecticut